Stathmopoda is a genus of moths. It has variously been placed in its own family, Stathmopodidae, or in subfamily Stathmopodinae in the family Oecophoridae. Note that the phylogeny and systematics of gelechoid moths are still not fully resolved.

Description 
Stathmopoda have smooth heads with a metallic luster, and the occiput may be smooth or slightly coarse. The labial palps (part of the mouthparts) are curved, sharp-tipped and the second and third segments are similar in length. There is a pair of antennae which are shorter than the forewing, have elongate and clubbed scapes, and (in males) the flagella have long ciliae on the anterior margins.

Both forewings and hindwings are lanceolate, meaning they are widest near the base and taper to points at the end. The forewings are usually yellowish with dark brown markings. The tibiae of the hind legs have dense tufts.

Most of the abdominal tergites (2nd-7th of males, 2nd-6th of females) have spiniform (spine-like) setae along their posterior margins.

The male genitalia have a bell-shaped uncus that is setose laterally and tapering caudally, and is as long as the gnathos. The cucullus is densely setose on its inner margin. The female genitalia have the corpus bursae bearing a signum or a pair of signa. See Lepidoptera genitalia for definitions of these terms.

Ecology 
Larvae of Stathmopoda bore into seeds, fruits or buds of plants. 

Some are agricultural pests. For example, S. auriferella is a pest of fruits and vegetables including apples, avocados, grapes, jujubes, kiwifruit, peaches and pomegranates. Stathmopoda masinissa can cause serious damage to persimmons.

Selected species

Stathmopoda aconias Meyrick, 1897 (India, Sri Lanka)
Stathmopoda aegotricha Meyrick, 1921
Stathmopoda aenea (Braun, 1918)
Stathmopoda albata  Meyrick, 1913  (Australia, New Guinea, Solomon Islands)
Stathmopoda albimaculata Philpott, 1931
Stathmopoda amathodes Turner, 1941
Stathmopoda anconias Meyrick, 1910
Stathmopoda anticyma  Meyrick, 1927 (Samoa and Solomon Islands)
Stathmopoda antischema Meyrick, 1922
Stathmopoda aphanosema Turner, 1923
Stathmopoda aposema Meyrick, 1901
Stathmopoda arachnitis Meyrick, 1907 (Sri Lanka)
Stathmopoda arachnophthora Turner, 1917
Stathmopoda arcata Meyrick, 1913
Stathmopoda aristodoxa Meyrick, 1926
Stathmopoda astrapeis Meyrick, 1897
Stathmopoda auriferella (Walker, 1864)
Stathmopoda autoxantha Meyrick, 1913
Stathmopoda basixantha Turner, 1917
Stathmopoda bathrodelta Meyrick, 1921
Stathmopoda biclavis Meyrick, 1911
Stathmopoda bicolorella Koster, 2010
Stathmopoda callichrysa Lower, 1893
Stathmopoda calyptraea Meyrick, 1908 (Burma)
Stathmopoda caminora Meyrick, 1890
Stathmopoda campylocha Meyrick, 1889
Stathmopoda canonica Meyrick, 1897
Stathmopoda castanodes Turner, 1941
Stathmopoda caveata  Meyrick, 1913 (New Guinea, Solomon Islands)
Stathmopoda cephalaea Meyrick, 1897
Stathmopoda ceramoptila Turner, 1923
Stathmopoda chalcotypa Meyrick, 1897
Stathmopoda chalybeis Meyrick, 1897
Stathmopoda citrinopis Meyrick, 1927
Stathmopoda citroptila Turner, 1941
Stathmopoda clarkei Viette, 1951
Stathmopoda clyella  Busck, 1909
Stathmopoda coracodes Meyrick, 1923
Stathmopoda cornutella  Bradley, 1961 (Solomon Islands)
Stathmopoda crassella Walsingham, 1891
Stathmopoda crocophanes Meyrick, 1897
Stathmopoda cyanopla Meyrick, 1897
Stathmopoda daubanella (Legrand, 1958)
Stathmopoda desmoteles Meyrick, 1897
Stathmopoda dracaenopa  Meyrick, 1933 (Fidji, Guam, Solomon Islands)
Stathmopoda diclidias Meyrick, 1921
Stathmopoda dimochla Turner, 1941
Stathmopoda diplaspis (Meyrick, 1887)
Stathmopoda distincta Philpott, 1923
Stathmopoda doratias Meyrick, 1897
Stathmopoda effossa Meyrick, 1921
Stathmopoda elyella Busck, 1909 
Stathmopoda endotherma Meyrick, 1931
Stathmopoda electrantha  Meyrick, 1927 (New Hebrides, Solomon Islands)
Stathmopoda epilampra Meyrick, 1911
Stathmopoda eucorystis 	Meyrick, 1936
Stathmopoda euzona (Turner, 1926)
Stathmopoda ficivora Kasy, 1973
Stathmopoda filicula Clarke, 1978
Stathmopoda glyceropa Meyrick, 1915
Stathmopoda glyphanobola 	Diakonoff, 1983
Stathmopoda grammatopis Meyrick, 1921
Stathmopoda haplophanes  Bradley, 1961 (Solomon Islands)
Stathmopoda hemiplecta Meyrick, 1921
Stathmopoda hexatyla Meyrick, 1907 (Sri Lanka, Russia)
Stathmopoda holobapta Lower, 1904
Stathmopoda holochra Meyrick, 1889
Stathmopoda holothecta Meyrick, 1934
Stathmopoda horticola Dugdale, 1988
Stathmopoda hyposcia Meyrick, 1897
Stathmopoda imperator  Bradley, 1957 (Solomon Islands)
Stathmopoda iodes Meyrick, 1897
Stathmopoda ischnotis Meyrick, 1897
Stathmopoda isoclera (Meyrick, 1897)
Stathmopoda lethonoa Meyrick, 1897
Stathmopoda liporrhoa Meyrick, 1897
Stathmopoda luminata Meyrick, 1911
Stathmopoda luxuriosa Meyrick, 1911
Stathmopoda lychnacma (Meyrick, 1927)
Stathmopoda maculata Walsingham, 1891
Stathmopoda maisongrossiella Viette, 1954
Stathmopoda mannophora Turner, 1900
Stathmopoda margabim Viette, 1995 (Reunion)
Stathmopoda maritimicola Terada & Sakamaki, 2011
Stathmopoda marmarosticha Turner, 1941
Stathmopoda masinissa  Meyrick, 1906 (Sri Lanka)
Stathmopoda megathyma Meyrick, 1897
Stathmopoda melanochra Meyrick, 1897 (Australia)
Stathmopoda mesombra Meyrick, 1897
Stathmopoda metopias Meyrick, 1920
Stathmopoda mimantha Meyrick, 1913
Stathmopoda monoxesta (Meyrick, 1929)
Stathmopoda morelella 	Legrand, 1966
Stathmopoda moschlosema  Bradley, 1961 (Solomon Islands)
Stathmopoda mysteriastis Meyrick, 1901
Stathmopoda nephocentra Meyrick, 1921
Stathmopoda nitida Meyrick, 1913
Stathmopoda notochorda Meyrick, 1907 (Sri Lanka)
Stathmopoda notosticha Turner, 1941
Stathmopoda nucivora  Meyrick, 1932  (Solomon Islands)
Stathmopoda nympheuteria Turner, 1941
Stathmopoda ochrochyta (Turner, 1926)
Stathmopoda osteitis 	Meyrick, 1917
Stathmopoda pampolia Turner, 1923
Stathmopoda pantarches Meyrick, 1897
Stathmopoda pedella (Linnaeus, 1761)
Stathmopoda pedestrella 	Legrand, 1966
Stathmopoda perfuga (Meyrick, 1928)
Stathmopoda periclina  Meyrick, 1938 (New Guinea, Solomon Islands)
Stathmopoda placida Meyrick, 1908 (Burma)
Stathmopoda platynipha Turner, 1923
Stathmopoda plumbiflua Meyrick, 1911
Stathmopoda pomifera Meyrick, 1913
Stathmopoda principalis Meyrick, 1913 (Comoros)
Stathmopoda ptycholampra Turner, 1941
Stathmopoda pyrrhogramma Meyrick, 1930
Stathmopoda recondita Turner, 1941
Stathmopoda revincta Meyrick, 1921
Stathmopoda rhodocosma Turner, 1941
Stathmopoda rhythmota Meyrick, 1920
Stathmopoda rubripicta Meyrick, 1921
Stathmopoda sentica (Lower, 1899)
Stathmopoda skelloni Butler, 1880
Stathmopoda sphendonita Meyrick, 1921
Stathmopoda superdaubanella (Legrand, 1958)
Stathmopoda teleozona Meyrick, 1921
Stathmopoda tetrazyga  Meyrick, 1936 (Solomon Islands)
Stathmopoda trichodora (Meyrick, 1909)
Stathmopoda trichopeda Lower, 1904
Stathmopoda trichrysa
Stathmopoda tridryas Meyrick, 1934
Stathmopoda trifida Meyrick, 1921
Stathmopoda trimochla Turner, 1941
Stathmopoda trimolybdias Meyrick, 1926
Stathmopoda triselena Meyrick, 1897
Stathmopoda tritophaea Turner, 1917
Stathmopoda vadoniella Viette, 1954
Stathmopoda xanthocrana Turner, 1933
Stathmopoda xanthoma Meyrick, 1897
Stathmopoda xanthoplitis Meyrick, 1908
Stathmopoda zalodes Meyrick, 1913
Stathmopoda zophoptila Turner, 1941

Former species
Stathmopoda attiei Guillermet, 2011 (now in Calicotis - from China, Japan, Réunion, Taiwan)

References

Stathmopodidae
Moth genera
Taxa named by Gottlieb August Wilhelm Herrich-Schäffer